Anglo-Norman may refer to:

Anglo-Normans, the medieval ruling class in England following the Norman conquest of 1066
Anglo-Norman language
Anglo-Norman literature
Anglo-Norman England, or Norman England, the period in English history from 1066 till 1154
Anglo-Norman horse, a breed from Normandy, France
Anglo-Norman Isles, or Channel Islands, an archipelago in the English Channel
CSS Anglo-Norman, a gunboat of the Confederate Navy

See also
Cambro-Normans
Normans in Ireland
Scoto-Norman

Language and nationality disambiguation pages